is the 19th studio album by Japanese singer-songwriter Miyuki Nakajima, released in October 1991.

The album features remix version of "Tokyo Maigo", a song released as a less successful lead single in June 1991. Gospelesque "Odayaka na Jidai" is a remake version of a song that she originally contributed for the news program News Station aired on TV Asahi in the mid 1980s. "Ta-Wa-Wa" features horn sections that played by the members of a group Tokyo Ska Paradise Orchestra who were still not famous at that time.

Backing tracks of the songs like "Nagisa e" and "Minami Sanjou" were mostly recorded with North American session musicians including Abe Laboriel, Paulinho da Costa and Dean Parks. In addition to such musicians, Rita Coolidge participated in "Odayaka na Jidai" as one of the backing vocalists. Since Uta de shika Ienai album, Nakajima came to appoint those distinguished players for her recording.

Track listing
All songs written and composed by Miyuki Nakajima, arranged by Ichizo Seo (except horn arrangement of "Ta-Wa-Wa" by Masahiko Kitahara, strings arrangement of "Sapporo Snowy" by Mitsuo Hagita).
 "C.Q." – 7:55
 "" – 7:10
 "" [Album Mix] – 5:08
 "Maybe" – 6:19
 "" – 6:10
 "" – 6:56
 "" – 5:15
 "" – 4:50
 "" – 5:40
 "" – 7:32
 "" – 6:49

Personnel
Tsuyoshi Kon – Electric guitar, pedal-Steel Guitar, slide guitar
Shigeru Suzuki – Electric guitar
Paul Jackson, Jr. – Electric guitar
Chuei Yoshikawa – Acoustic Guitar, flat mandolin
Dean Parks – Acoustic Guitar
Abraham Laboriel – Electric bass
Yasuo Tomikura – Electric bass
Chiharu Mikuzuki – Electric bass
Kenji Takamizu – Electric bass
Nobu Saito – Percussion
Paulinho da Costa – Percussion
John Robinson – Drums
Hideo Yamaki – Drums
Eiji Shimamura – Drums
Elton Nagata – Keyboards
Nobuo Kurata – Piano, keyboards, synth bass
Ryoichi Kuniyoshi – Keyboards, synth bass
Joe Group – Strings
Nobuhiko Nakayama – Computer programming
Keishi Urata – Computer programming, drum programming, synth percussion
Tatsuhiko Mori – Computer programming, drum programming
Ichizo Seo – Computer programming, drum programming, synth percussion, keyboards, piano, background vocals
Ska Para Horns
Masahiko Kitahara – Trombone, horn arrangement
Nargo (credited to Kimiyoshi Nagoya) – Trumpet
Gamou – Tenor sax
Toshihiko Furumura – Tenor sax
Yasuhiro Kido – Background vocals
Kiyoshi Hiyama – Background vocals
Yuiko Tsubokura – Background vocals
Kazuyo Sugimoto – Background vocals
Maxi Anderson – Background vocals
Clydene Jackson – Background vocals
Carmen Twillie – Background vocals
Monalisa Young – Background vocals
Varelie Kashimura – Background vocals
Joey Diggs – Background vocals
David Lasley – Background vocals
Arnold McCuller – Background vocals
Fred White – Background vocals
Rita Coolidge – Background vocals

Chart positions

Release history

References

Miyuki Nakajima albums
1991 albums
Pony Canyon albums